There are two buildings with the name St Kentigern's Church in Lanark:

St Kentigern's Church, Lanark (Hope Street) - the newer of the churches, built in 1883. Closed and merged with Cairns Church in the 1990s, the building has since been converted to offices and residences.
St Kentigern's Church, Lanark (Hyndford Road) - a now ruined 13th century building sits on the site, but the church has existed here since at least 1150.